Waterton Castle is a ruined 17th-century tower house, about  east of Ellon, Aberdeenshire, Scotland, north of the River Ythan.

History
The property belonged to Kinloss Abbey; the Knights Templar acquired it, and it passed from them to the Bannermans around 1560.  The Forbeses thereafter owned it until 1770 (at least).
It is suggested that the castle was built between 1630 and 1640.

In 1652 the Kennedys of Kermuck murdered John Forbes of Waterton.

Structure
A sketch from 1770 showed a four-storey building comprising a central block with wings to east and west.  These projected a little from the main block, and had crow-stepped gables
The vaulted building bears the inscription in the inner south wall: "This stone marks the site of the ancient seat of the family of Forbes, Lairds of Waterton A.D. 1630 - 1770."
In 1844 a drinking horn was dug from the castle ruins; in 1863 it was donated to the National Museum of Antiquities of Scotland.

See also
Castles in Great Britain and Ireland
List of castles in Scotland

References

Castles in Aberdeenshire